Mount Goodman is a mountain marking the northeastern extremity of the Behrendt Mountains, in Ellsworth Land, Antarctica. It was mapped by the United States Geological Survey from surveys and U.S. Navy air photos from 1961 to 1967, and was named by the Advisory Committee on Antarctic Names after Alan L. Goodman, an aurora scientist at Eights Station in 1963.

See also
 Mountains in Antarctica

References

Mountains of Ellsworth Land